Laurent Lemoine (born 24 April 1998) is a Belgian footballer who plays as a defender for Lommel in the Challenger Pro League.

Personal life
Born in Belgium, Lemoine is of Brazilian descent.

References

External links

1998 births
Living people
People from La Louvière
Footballers from Hainaut (province)
Belgian footballers
Association football defenders
Club Brugge KV players
K.S.V. Roeselare players
K.V. Mechelen players
Lommel S.K. players
Challenger Pro League players
Belgian people of Brazilian descent